This is a list of notable people associated with Thanjavur district in Tamil Nadu, India

Academicians 

 Sakkottai Krishnaswami Aiyangar (1871–1947), Indian historian and Dravidologist.
 Srinivasa Ramanujan (1887–1920), Indian mathematician. Regarded amongst the world's greatest mathematicians.
 U. V. Swaminatha Iyer(1855–1942), Tamil scholar, linguist, and music composer. 
 P. Dawood shah  (1885–1969) Tamil Scholar and activist.

Religious and spiritual leaders 

 Abirami Pattar (c. 18th century), was a Tamil saint and poet. Author of Abirami Anthathi and Hindu religious works in Tamil.
 Sri Sri Ravi Shankar (born 1956), spiritual leader, yogi, and founder of 'Art of Living'.

Administrators 

 Sir T. Madhava Rao (1828–1891), Diwan of Travancore from 1857 to 1872, and an early leader of the Indian National Congress.
 T. Venkata Rao, Diwan of Travancore from 1821 to 1829 and 1838 to 1839.
 T. Ananda Rao (1852–1919), Indian administrator. Diwan of Mysore from 1909 to 1912. Son of Sir T. Madhava Rao.
 V. P. Madhava Rao (1850–1934), Indian administrator. Diwan of Mysore from 1906 to 1909 and Baroda from 1910 to 1913.

Journalists 

 G. A. Natesan (1873–1948), Indian journalist and publisher. Founder of publishing company G. A. Natesan & Co. and editor of The Indian Review.

Artists 
 N.Srinivasan, Artist famous for Digital Paintings, who have received Kalaimamani award in 2009.

Film Artists 
 T. R. Rajakumari (1922–1999)
 Sivaji Ganesan (1928–2001)
 Vijayakumar (Tamil actor)
 Hema Malini
 Rajesh
 Prabhu
 S. Shankar
 Sukanya
 Arvind Swami
 Dhivyadharshini

Political leaders 
 Ko. Si. Mani (b. 1929), Minister in the Tamil Nadu State Government.
 G. K. Vasan (b. 1964), Cabinet Minister in the Government of India.Rajya Sabha Member. Leader of Tamil Manilaa Congress.
 G. K. Moopanar (1931–2001), Tamil politician and leader of the Indian National Congress. Founder of the Tamil Manilaa Congress.
 A Y S Parisutham Nadar (1909–1985), member of the Indian National Congress, MLA in 1946-1952, 1957–1962, and 1967-1971. Municipal Chairman, 1959-1961.
 S. Muthiah Mudaliar (1883–1953), Indian politician of the Justice Party, and, later, the Swaraj Party. Minister of education and excise for the Madras Presidency from 1928 to 1930.
 Sir P. S. Sivaswami Iyer (1864–1946), Indian lawyer. Advocate General of Madras Presidency from 1907 to 1911.
 V. S. Srinivasa Sastri (1869–1946), Indian freedom fighter, orator and teacher. Was called the "Silver Tongued Orator of the British Empire" by Winston Churchill.
 S. A. Saminatha Iyer (d. 1899), Indian lawyer and freedom-fighter.
 R. Venkataraman (1910–2009), Indian politician and freedom fighter. Served as the 8th President of India (1987–1992); Vice-President of India (1984–1987)
 M.Karunanidhi
 Adanjur A.Singaravel viruthullar (1898-1960), Congress leader and member of Thanjavur district board (consisting of Nagapattinam, thiruvarur and pudukottai) from 1949-1959.
 R. Swaminatha Merkondar,a  member of the Indian National Congress party, represented the District of Uthiramerur in the Madras Assembly from 1957-62 representing the Tiruvaiyaru constituency.
 M. Ramkumar, is an Indian politician and former Member of the Legislative Assembly of Tamil Nadu. He was the chairman district panchayat (Thanjavur district) from 1996 to 2001.

Sports 
 Varun Chakravarthy, Indian cricketer.

Thanjavur people
 
Thanjavur